Lola Montez was a 1962 Australian TV play which was based on the musical of the same name.

The TV production was directed by Alan Burke, who had written the book for the musical.  Australian TV drama was relatively rare at the time.

Plot summary

Cast
 Brigid Lenihan as Lola Montez
 Campbell Copelin as Seekamp
 Mary Duchesne as Mary in Bavaria
 Alida Glasbecek as Gisela
 Patsy Hemingway as Jane
 Alan Hopgood as Smith
 John Kendall as Jocko
 Reginald Newson as Wilson
 Anne Peterson as Nancy
 Ron Pinnell as Crosbie
 Rex Reid as King Ludwig I of Bavaria
 Beverley Richards as Ilsa
 Johnny Rohan as Daniel
 Leslie Sinclair as Mac
 Frank Wilson as Sam

Production
Burke says because he directed, things were not misunderstood. Johnny Rohan was cast as Daniel after Burke saw him singing on a pop show. For the role of Lola, Burke wanted to cast an actress who could sing, and picked New Zealander Brigid Lenihan, who had appeared in shows such as Little Woman, Revue 61 and A Night Out.

It was filmed in the ABC's Southbank Studios in Melbourne. Choreography was by Rex Reid, and Mary Duchesne danced the Lola in the Bavaria sequence. The dance ensemble included Kelvin Coe and Barry Moreland. There were 33 actors, singers and dancers.

Songs
 "Southerly Buster" - sung by miners
 "Saturday Girl" - sung to by Daniel to Jane
 "Let Me Sing Let Me Dance" - sung by Daniel to Lola
 "Maria Dolores Eliza Rosamia" - sung by Sam and Lola
 "A Lady Finds a Love" - sung by Lola and Dan
 "I'm the Man"
 "There's Gold in Them There Hills"
 "Lady Lady Please Don't Cry"
 "Summer Been and Fore"
 I Can See a Town"
 "He's Mine"
 "Beware"
 "I Alone"
 "Partner Name Your Poison"

Reception
The Age praised the "superb acting" of Lenihan but felt apart from Frank Wilson that "others in the show... gave stereotyped performances."
The Sydney Morning Herald thought the character of Lola remained "the most intractable fact" of the production thinking she was better used to "material for a sensitive play which hardly in with the lusty, simplicity of a musical that sounds like a marriage of Oklahoma and Paint Your Wagon... All the same, it was interesting to have the  chance of seeing again a. musical that promised so much for the talents that combined to devise it; and also a little saddening to think how little has been heard of these talents since."

The Sunday Herald said "it was a brilliant piece of work, sizzling in pace from start to finish, with a cast and chorus as perfectly rehearsed and drilled as an Army platoon. "Lola Montez" was good on stage; it emerges on television even better; almost as though it had been originally written with the small screen in mind. The only flaw in the entire 90 minutes so far as I was concerned, and it was a minor one, was [the]... dream sequence flashback to Lola's days as a court beauty. It was competently done, but it dragged a little toward the end."

Frank Roberts of The Bulletin admitted to missing the first half of the broadcast but still ran his review saying "the   part   I   did   see was   so   lacking   in   entertainment   values  that   the   use   of   90   minutes   of   prime viewing   time   for   a   show   of   that   standard would   not   prove   courage,   but   sheer  foolhardiness... On   “Lola   Montez’s”   showing,   very  little   of   the   talent   on   view   deserved   encouraging.   It   is   difficult   to   criticise   the production   piecemeal   because   nearly   all  of   its   ingredients   were   uniformly   dreadful."

See also
 List of television plays broadcast on Australian Broadcasting Corporation (1960s)

References

External links
 1962 TV adaptation at AustLit
 1962 TV adaptation at IMDb

1962 television plays
Cultural depictions of Lola Montez
1960s Australian television plays